John Behrent (born 5 July 1938) is a New Zealand former cricketer. He played first-class cricket for Auckland and Wellington between 1959 and 1968.

See also
 List of Auckland representative cricketers

References

External links
 

1938 births
Living people
New Zealand cricketers
Auckland cricketers
Wellington cricketers
Cricketers from Auckland